Hamilton Sloan (born 9 December 1945 in Belfast ) is an Irish painter. He lives in Bangor.

Early life
He was born in Belfast and spent a lot of his life in Comber, County Down.

Career
Sloan worked in the Ulster Museum and completed many of the exhibits there today, the best known being Peter the Polar Bear.

Sloan pent several years in Donegal perfecting his craft.

He has lived and painted throughout Ireland.  He works mostly in oil and watercolour.

His work is included in the collections of  many Irish public bodies, and in private collections, including two former Irish Taoiseachs and many of Northern Ireland's leading politicians.

References

External links
Hamilton Sloan Bio and Blogs
The White Gallery
Art Irish .com
Gerrys Fine Irish Art
Eakin Gallery
Throat Lake Gallery

1945 births
People from County Down
20th-century Irish painters
21st-century Irish painters
Irish male painters
Painters from Northern Ireland
Living people
20th-century Irish male artists